The Assistant Secretary of State for International Security and Nonproliferation is the head of the Bureau of International Security and Nonproliferation, which is responsible for managing the nonproliferation, counter-proliferation, and arms control functions of the United States Department of State. The position was created on September 13, 2005, when the Bureau of Arms Control and the Bureau of Nonproliferation were merged.  The Assistant Secretary of State for International Security and Nonproliferation reports to the Under Secretary of State for Arms Control and International Security Affairs.

Stephen Rademaker was the first Acting Assistant Secretary of State for International Security and Nonproliferation. He had been the Assistant Secretary for the Bureau of Arms Control, and in February 2005 he was named the head of the Bureau for Nonproliferation pending the two bureaus' merger. He was succeeded by Acting Secretary Francis C. Record and replaced by John C. Rood.

Assistant Secretaries of State for International Security and Nonproliferation

External links

 
Nuclear proliferation

2005 establishments in Washington, D.C.